Damascus is a village in Damascus Township, Wayne County, Pennsylvania, United States.  The Damascus-Cochecton Bridge connects the town with Cochecton, New York across the Delaware River.  The bridge is often used by smugglers of fireworks, legal in Pennsylvania but illegal in New York State, in the run-up to the Independence Day holiday, in which observance fireworks are used extensively.

History
The Damascus Post Office has been in operation since January 24, 1824.

References

Unincorporated communities in Wayne County, Pennsylvania
Unincorporated communities in Pennsylvania